How Clean Is Your House? is a British entertainment/lifestyle television programme in which expert cleaners Kim Woodburn and Aggie MacKenzie visit dirty houses and clean them up. The thirty-minute show was produced by Talkback Thames, the UK production arm of Fremantle (itself part of the RTL Group), and aired on Channel 4 from 2003 to 2009. Though a ratings success, Channel 4 announced that they had decided to cancel the series in 2009 in order to make way for new programming.

Format
Each episode of the programme followed the same formula. Accompanied by a dramatic score of horror movie music,  Woodburn and MacKenzie explore the abode on their own, examining the extent of the mess and looking for any particularly horrible areas.  They then meet the resident before the cleaning begins, assisted by several professional cleaners. During this process, which takes up the bulk of the show, tips are shared for tackling particular cleaning tasks with the residents, often relying on traditional solutions rather than proprietary commercial cleaning products.

During the cleaning, MacKenzie takes swab samples from the filthiest areas of the house and has them analysed in a lab, often revealing numerous kinds of bacteria, frequently E. coli or Salmonella. Residents of the homes often have health problems that directly stem from the air quality or pathogens present before cleaning; Woodburn will show the residents her findings in an effort to make them understand the connection between their health and their home's condition.

The final section of the show has Woodburn and MacKenzie unveiling the freshly cleaned home to the resident. In earlier episodes, they would return to the home several weeks later to see if the cleaning was being maintained.

The show makes a point of thoroughly cleaning carpets and furniture the resident owns, and not replacing dirty or worn items just for the sake of the final reveal. In a few particular cases in which a resident lacked basic items of furniture (such as one who might have been sleeping on a mattress on the floor rather than a bed), Aggie and Kim might coordinate with neighbours or local secondhand shops to donate items.

Woodburn takes the role of a dominating woman, scolding residents for letting their homes get so bad. She is sometimes playfully flirtatious with male residents. In contrast, MacKenzie (whose previous jobs included associate editor in Good Housekeeping and working for MI6) assumes the more serious "dirt detective" role, performing such tasks as the bacterial analysis.  She plays at being more squeamish than Woodburn, claiming that she will be sick or run away from a particularly horrific home.  While cleaning, both wear industrial white suits and rubber gloves adorned with marabou feathers and fake gemstones.

Actor Paul Copley provides tongue-in-cheek, often alliterative voice-over narration for each episode. The show is light-hearted and often camp, falling just as much into the entertainment category than the factual genre. Much of the appeal comes from the voyeuristic pleasure of seeing how untidy some people let their houses become (many have not been cleaned for years) and the reactions of the show's two stars, though the cleaning tips add some practical value to the show.

Final series 
The sixth and final series aired in the UK on Channel 4 from 13 August - 24 September 2009, and was (for the first time) also broadcast in High Definition on Channel 4 HD. Primarily the same format as previous editions, Kim and Aggie continued to seek out "the UK's filthiest homes", however, the program was promoted as delving far deeper into the psyche of the home owners. In addition, the two-week "check-up" was omitted from the show's formula, but Kim and Aggie undertook a roadshow style appearance in each episode where they would meet members of the public to answer questions and offer cleaning tips.

In November 2009, Channel 4 announced that they had decided to end the series after six years as part of its ongoing "creative renewal" for programming. Channel 4's head of programming, Julian Bellamy, said the series had been one of several "huge hits" for the channel, but that his focus was now on "finding the next generation of groundbreaking shows".

DVD & VHS Releases
How Clean Is Your House? received a release on both DVD and VHS in the UK on 8 November 2004.

How Clean Is Your House? USA Seasons 1 & 2 was released on DVD in the US on 4 March 2008.

Spin-offs and international adaptations 
The format has been adapted to many other countries.  A United States version, starring Kim and Aggie, premiered in September 2004 on the Lifetime network and ran for two seasons. This edition also aired in the UK on Channel 4. This version has been criticized for using product placement such as Mr Clean and Bounty instead of the homemade cleaning solutions that the UK version uses. Both the UK & US versions aired in Canada on the W Network and in Australia on cable television channel UK.TV.

A Dutch version titled Hoe schoon is jouw huis? (a literal translation of the original English title) has been made with two Dutch ladies performing the same role as Kim and Aggie do in the original. The show aired on the commercial RTL-4 channel and has been re-run on RTL-5. The original British series also aired on Dutch television under the Dutch title.

A French version titled C'est du Propre! ("Now That's Clean!") aired on M6 and on other channels of the M6 group (Téva, W9). The French "cleaning ladies" are Danièle Odin and Béatrice de Malembert. Two tie-in books have been published.

A spin-off book, How Clean Is Your House?, written by Kim and Aggie, was published in 2003. FreemantleMedia has also signed licensing and merchandising deals with many cleaning product manufacturers and other companies.

In 2004, Kim and Aggie made a spin-off series called Too Posh to Wash about the personal hygiene of upper-class people, including one participant who had never washed her bra.  They also did a one-off special, When Kim & Aggie Went to Hospital, which aired 30 August 2006, about how to keep our hospitals clean. In this hour-long special, the pair traveled to Ealing Hospital, which has often been criticized for poor hygiene conditions and regularly finishes at the bottom of the NHS Hospital League Tables.

International versions 
 Belgium: Schoon en Meedogenloos
 Bosnia and Herzegovina: Odred za čistoću
 Croatia: Odred za čistoću
 Czech Republic: Máte doma uklizeno?
 Finland: Sillä siisti
 France: C'est du propre !
 Germany: Die Putzteufel - Deutschland macht sauber
 Greece: Αστραφτερά Σπίτια
 Hungary: Tiszta a lakásod?
 Iceland: Allt í drasli
 Italy: Case da incubo
 New Zealand: How Clean is Your House?
 Netherlands: Hoe schoon is jouw Huis?
 Norway: Ekstrem Rengjøring (Extreme Cleaning)
 Philippines: Pilipinas Instant Bahay Makeover TV5 (June 2020)
 Poland: Czysta chata
 Romania: Curat Murdar
 Russia: Две блондинки против грязи
 Spain: Hogar, sucio hogar
 Sweden: Rent hus (Clean house)
 Vietnam: Nhà bẩn - Nhà sạch? (VTV3)

References

External links 

 
 (U.S. version) Website
 The How Clean is Your House? Cleaning Team
 Channel4 Interview Kim and Aggies Cleaning Team

2000s British reality television series
2003 British television series debuts
2009 British television series endings
Channel 4 original programming
Lifetime (TV network) original programming
Television series by Fremantle (company)
English-language television shows
Television shows set in Nottinghamshire